The Baldwin Peninsula is a peninsula located on the Arctic Circle in the northwestern region of the U.S. state of Alaska, at . It extends  into Kotzebue Sound from the Alaska mainland and defines the south boundary of Hotham Inlet.  It is 2–19 km (1–12 miles) wide and named after Leonard D. Baldwin, a New York City attorney and investor who in conjunction with the Lomen brothers, introduced domesticated reindeer to Alaska, turning Alaskan Eskimos from nomads to pastoral farmers.

The city of Kotzebue and Ralph Wien Memorial Airport are located at the end of the peninsula. The remainder of Baldwin Peninsula is covered with permafrost and hundreds of tundra lakes.

External links
 Tundra lakes on Baldwin Peninsula, photos

Sources
 USGS Geographic Names Information System, Baldwin Peninsula

Landforms of Northwest Arctic Borough, Alaska
Peninsulas of Alaska
Landforms of the Chukchi Sea